Saskatoon Business College  is a private vocational career college located in Saskatoon, Saskatchewan, Canada. The college grants vocational diplomas, as well as skills training certification, and Corporate Training.

Programs
The college grants vocational diplomas in areas of Office Administration (including Legal, Medical and Executive Assistant), Business Administration, Accounting, Graphic Design, and IT Network Administration. All diploma programs take one year or less to complete. In August 2014, Saskatoon Business College was named a Designated Learning Institution for International Students planning to study in Saskatchewan.

History
Saskatoon Business College was founded by Robert D. Campbell in May of 1907.  Mr. Ernest Marshall and Mr. David Marshall can be credited for bringing the College forward.  From the late 1920s to early 1950s the College was associated with the Success Business College chain of schools as part of a Canada-wide chain of colleges operated by Frederick Garbutt (1876-1947) of Calgary, Alberta.
During this time, the College assumed name titles such as the Saskatoon-Success Business College, as well as the Success Secretarial College and School of Accountancy.  Briefly held by Mr. Lewis Furse, Success College was acquired by Fred and Helen Chapman in 1951 who reverted the College back to its original name, Saskatoon Business College. Saskatoon Business College moved from its Second Avenue to the Third Avenue business district in 1963.  It has now been in the Chapman Family for three generations.

Corporate Training

Saskatoon Business College’s Corporate Division offers training with Windows OS, as well as the Microsoft Office suite, as well as skills certification training in graphic design, Network Administration, and soft skills like coaching and time management.

Affiliations
 National Association of Career Colleges
 Shinerama - Cystic Fibrosis

See also
 Higher education in Saskatchewan
 List of colleges in Canada#Saskatchewan

References

External links
Saskatoon Business College
National Association of Career Colleges
Canadian Education and Training Accreditation Commission

Colleges in Saskatchewan
Vocational education in Canada
Business schools in Canada
Education in Saskatoon